Pantonyssus is a genus of beetles in the family Cerambycidae, containing the following species:

 Pantonyssus bitinctus Gounelle, 1909
 Pantonyssus erichsonii (White, 1853)
 Pantonyssus flavipes Fisher, 1944
 Pantonyssus glabricollis Fuchs, 1961
 Pantonyssus nigriceps Bates, 1870
 Pantonyssus obscurus Martins, 2005
 Pantonyssus pallidus Martins, 1995
 Pantonyssus puncticollis Martins, 1995
 Pantonyssus santossilvai Martins, 2005

References

Elaphidiini